Mount Lawley is an inner northern suburb of Perth, Western Australia. The suburb is bounded by the Swan River to the east, Vincent, Harold and Pakenham Streets to the south, Central Avenue and Alexander Drive to the north, and Norfolk Street to the west.

History 
Before the establishment of the Swan River Colony, the area was occupied by the Yabbaru Bibbulman Noongar people, who used the nearby Boodjamooling wetland (later known as Third Swamp Reserve, and now as Hyde Park) as a camping, fishing and meeting ground.

In 1865, Perth Suburban lots 140 to 149 were designated; these were bounded by Beaufort Street, Walcott Street, Lord Street and Lincoln Street. The colony was granted representative government in 1870, at which time Vincent Street and Walcott Street became boundaries of the City of Perth.

The Tramways Act 1885 allowed for construction of Perth's first tramway network, with trams in the area servicing Vincent Street, Beaufort Street and Walcott Street.

The area was part of the subdivision of Highgate Hill, with the area north of Vincent Street still consisting of large acreage, where much of the land was owned by William Leeder. Between 1889 and 1901, a number of estates were established in the area, beginning with the East Norwood Estate and including Mount Lawley Estate.  Mount Lawley Estate was developed by R. T. Robinson and Sam Copley and stretched northwards from Walcott Street. The area of Mount Lawley was formally proclaimed in 1901. Mount Lawley was named in honour of Sir Arthur Lawley, the Governor of Western Australia from May 1901 to August 1902. His wife, Lady Annie Lawley, reputedly agreed to the naming of what was then primarily bushland in her husband's name on the condition that no licensed hotels be built in the suburb.

The Beaufort Street trams were replaced by trolley buses during the 1950s, and subsequently by diesel buses when the trolley bus service ended in 1968. A number of arterial streets carrying traffic in and out of the city centre began to carry heavy loads of traffic in the 1970s, and the suburb saw a significant commercial and residential revival from this period on.

Governance 
Mount Lawley comes under the jurisdiction of the City of Vincent, the City of Stirling and City of Bayswater local government areas.

At the state government level, the suburb is in the electoral districts of Mount Lawley and Perth, and it is in the Division of Perth at the federal government level.

Geography 
Mount Lawley is in the Perth Basin on the Swan Coastal Plain.  Much of the modern suburb is located within the former Perth Wetlands area, with significant drainage work being conducted in the area between 1832 and the 1880s.

Sites of interest

Astor Theatre
The Astor Theatre was constructed in 1914/15 and was originally named the "Lyceum Theatre", and subsequently the "State Theatre".  It was redesigned in an Art Deco style in 1939 and received its current name in 1941. It was listed on the State Register of Heritage Places in 1999.

Western Australian Academy of Performing Arts 
The Western Australian Academy of Performing Arts (WAAPA) was established in 1980 and teaches acting, musical theatre, directing, dance, jazz and contemporary music, classical music, arts management, production, design, and broadcasting.  WAAPA's alumni include Heath Ledger, Hugh Jackman and Tim Minchin.

Transport

Public transport 
Mount Lawley is well positioned to take advantage of public transit in Perth. The Mount Lawley train station is in the east of the suburb, and provides access to the Midland railway line. There are also a number of bus routes which service the area. Buses benefit from dedicated bus lanes along Beaufort Street, which are operational during weekday peak traffic periods, and the 950 connects Mount Lawley with the University of Western Australia in Crawley.

Approximately 16% of Mount Lawley residents use public transport to travel to work.

Road infrastructure 
The majority of the Mount Lawley road network is laid out in the regular grid pattern, which was the popular method at the time of subdivision.

The main collector road in Mount Lawley is Beaufort Street, which runs north–south linking Morley in the north to the Perth city centre in the south. Walcott Street is another collector road, running southeast–northwest through Mount Lawley, leading towards a main arterial, Wanneroo Road. Guildford Road / Lord Street is an arterial road running parallel to Beaufort Street linking to Graham Farmer Freeway, Tonkin Highway and Great Eastern Highway. Vincent Street connects Mount Lawley to the west, including North Perth and Leederville.

Demographics 

The median individual income for Mount Lawley residents in 2016 was $932 per week, while the median family income was $2555 per week. The median age of Mount Lawley residents was 36 years. In 2016 managers, professionals and clerical & administrative workers comprised 65% of the work force in Mount Lawley.

58% of Mount Lawley residents were Australian born. The next largest country of birth was England at 7%, followed by Italy at 2.5%. 45% of families in Mount Lawley were a couple household with no children, while 41% of families were a couple with children (living at home).

Education 
Mount Lawley hosts a campus of Edith Cowan University as well as the Western Australian Academy of Performing Arts.

The suburb is home to Mount Lawley Senior High School (MLSHS), a state school which opened in 1955 which was extensively renovated with $40 million of Government funding in 2005–06.

In addition to MLSHS, the suburb hosts the Anglican girls' school Perth College, a private K–12 campus for both day and boarding students, and two primary schools, being Mount Lawley Primary School and St Paul's Primary School.

References 

 
Suburbs of Perth, Western Australia

Suburbs in the City of Vincent